Power management integrated circuits (power management ICs or PMICs or PMU as unit) are integrated circuits for power management. Although PMIC refers to a wide range of chips (or modules in system-on-a-chip devices), most include several DC/DC converters or their control part. A PMIC is often included in battery-operated devices such as mobile phones and portable media players to decrease the amount of space required.

Overview
The term PMIC refers to a class of integrated circuits that perform various functions related to power requirements.
A PMIC may have one or more of the following functions:
 DC to DC conversion
 Battery charging
 Power-source selection
 Voltage scaling
 Power sequencing
 Miscellaneous functions

Power management ICs are solid state devices that control the flow and direction of electrical power. Many electrical devices use multiple internal voltages (e.g., 5 V, 3.3 V, 1.8 V, etc.) and sources of external power (e.g., wall outlet, battery, etc.), meaning that the power design of the device has multiple requirements for operation. A PMIC can refer to any chip that is an individual power related function, but generally refer to ICs that incorporate more than one function such as different power conversions and power controls such as voltage supervision and undervoltage protection. By incorporating these functions into one IC, a number of improvements to the overall design can be made such as better conversion efficiency, smaller solution size, and better heat dissipation.

Features
A PMIC may include battery management, voltage regulation, and charging functions. It may include a DC to DC converter to allow dynamic voltage scaling. Some models are known to feature up to 95% power conversion efficiency. Some models integrate with dynamic frequency scaling in a combination known as DVFS (dynamic voltage and frequency scaling).

It may be manufactured using BiCMOS process. They may come as QFN package. Some models feature I²C or SPI serial bus communications interface for I/O.

Some models feature a low-dropout regulator (LDO), and a real-time clock (RTC) co-operating with a backup battery.

A PMIC can use pulse-frequency modulation (PFM) and pulse-width modulation (PWM). It can use switching amplifier (Class-D electronic amplifier).

IC manufacturers

 Samsung Semiconductor
 Ricoh Electronic Devices
 Power Integrations
 STMicroelectronics
 Infineon Technologies AG
 Intel
 Marvell Semiconductor
 Qualcomm
 MediaTek
 IXYS
 NXP Semiconductors
 Silicon Mitus* Exar
 International Rectifier
 Intersil
 Cypress Semiconductor
 Renesas Electronics
 Rohm Semiconductor
 ON Semiconductor
 Texas Instruments
 Torex Semiconductor and Asahi Kasei Microdevices are some of many manufacturers of PMICs.

See also
 Power Management Unit (PMU)
 System Management Controller (SMC)
 System Basis Chip (SBC)
 Quick Charge

References

Integrated circuits